The 1984 United States presidential election in South Dakota took place on November 6, 1984. All 50 states and the District of Columbia, were part of the 1984 United States presidential election. Voters chose three electors to the Electoral College, which selected the president and vice president of the United States.

South Dakota was won by incumbent United States President Ronald Reagan of California, who was running against former Vice President Walter Mondale of Minnesota. Reagan ran for a second time with incumbent Vice President and former C.I.A. Director George H. W. Bush of Texas, and Mondale ran with Representative Geraldine Ferraro of New York, the first major female candidate for the vice presidency.

The presidential election of 1984 was a very partisan election for South Dakota, with over 99.5% of the electorate voting for either the Democratic or Republican parties, and only four candidates appearing on the ballot. All but two counties in South Dakota voted in majority for the Republican candidate. This included the typically more Democratic East River counties such as Brown, and Minnehaha (Sioux Falls). Reagan did the best in Haakon County, and Mondale did the best in nearby Shannon County, which gave Mondale his third-best percentage nationwide behind the District of Columbia and Alabama’s Macon County.

South Dakota weighed in for this election as about eight points more Republican than the national average. , this is the last election in which Dewey County, Buffalo County, and Clay County voted for a Republican presidential candidate.

Reagan carried South Dakota by 23.5%, the strongest performance of any presidential nominee in the state since 1952. After nearly voting for Carter in 1976, the state trended much more heavily Republican in both of Reagan's elections; it had been one of only nine to give Reagan over 60% of the vote in the three-way election of 1980. South Dakota became much more competitive in the drought-influenced 1988 election, but would go on to re-establish itself as a reliably red state in the 21st century. Even so, as of 2020, Reagan's 63.00% vote share in South Dakota has remained unmatched by any subsequent nominee.

Republican platform

By 1984, Ronald Reagan was very popular with voters across the nation as the President who saw them out of the economic stagflation of the early and middle 1970's, and into a period of (relative) economic stability.

The economic success seen under Reagan was politically accomplished (principally) in two ways. The first was initiation of deep tax cuts for the wealthy, and the second was a wide-spectrum of tax cuts for crude oil production and refinement, namely, with the 1980 Windfall profits tax cuts. These policies were augmented with a call for heightened military spending, the cutting of social welfare programs for the poor, and the increasing of taxes on those making less than $50,000 per year. Collectively called "Reaganomics", these economic policies were established through several pieces of legislation passed between 1980 and 1987.

Some of these new policies also arguably curbed several existing tax loopholes, preferences, and exceptions, but Reaganomics is typically remembered for its trickle down effect of taxing poor Americans more than rich ones. Reaganomics has (along with legislation passed under presidents George H. W. Bush and Bill Clinton) been criticized by many analysts as "setting the stage" for economic troubles in the United States after 2007, such as the Great Recession.

Virtually unopposed during the Republican primaries, Reagan ran on a campaign of furthering his economic policies. Reagan vowed to continue his "war on drugs," passing sweeping legislation after the 1984 election in support of mandatory minimum sentences for drug possession.  Furthermore, taking a (what was becoming the traditional conservative) stance on the social issues of the day, Reagan strongly opposed legislation regarding comprehension of gay marriage, abortion, and (to a lesser extent) environmentalism, regarding the final as simply being bad for business.

Democratic platform
Walter Mondale accepted the Democratic nomination for presidency after pulling narrowly ahead of Senator Gary Hart of Colorado and Rev. Jesse Jackson of Illinois - his main contenders during what would be a very contentious Democratic primary. During the primary campaign, Mondale was vocal about reduction of government spending, and, in particular, was vocal against heightened military spending on the nuclear arms race against the Soviet Union, which was reaching its peak on both sides in the early 1980s.

Taking a (what was becoming the traditional liberal) stance on the social issues of the day, Mondale advocated for gun control, the right to choose regarding abortion, and strongly opposed the repeal of laws regarding institutionalized prayer in public schools. He also criticized Reagan for his economic marginalization of the poor, stating that Reagan's reelection campaign was "a happy talk campaign," not focused on the real issues at hand.

A very significant political move during this election: the Democratic Party nominated Representative Geraldine Ferraro to run with Mondale as Vice-President. Ferraro is the first female candidate to receive such a nomination in United States history. She said in an interview at the 1984 Democratic National Convention that this action "opened a door which will never be closed again," speaking to the role of women in politics.

Results

Results by county

See also
 Presidency of Ronald Reagan
 United States presidential elections in South Dakota

References

South Dakota
1984
1984 South Dakota elections